Daniel William Ewart Murnane (23 March 1926 – 18 April 2016) was an Australian rules footballer who played with St Kilda in the Victorian Football League (VFL).

Notes

External links 

1926 births
Australian rules footballers from Victoria (Australia)
St Kilda Football Club players
Moorabbin Football Club players
2016 deaths